María del Barrio is a Spanish actress born 5 July 1989 in the town of Alcalá de Henares, Madrid. She began her career at  the age of 14 working  with   Sadrac González and Sonia Escolano in the short film: Mr. Long-Neck.

She also participated in plays such as Medea (2005) and Bodas de Sangre. She participated in the shooting of other short films such  as Juliets, in which she played the role of a young girl with terminal cancer who had committed suicide.

In October 2008, del Barrio began filming her first feature film, Myna Has Gone, where she played a young undocumented immigrant who has a bitter experience, and which  according to del  Barrio, was extremely difficult due in part to the tough and controversial sex scene in the film, and required three months of rehearsals and psychological support. Myna se va won the "Narrative Feature Special Jury Recognition for Acting" at the 2009 Austin Film Festival. She also won the award for best actress in the Naperville Independent Film Festival.

In 2011 the film Myna has gone was released in theaters in the United States which include the cities of
Minneapolis, Los Angeles, St. Louis, Phoenix, Houston, San Francisco, Dallas, Seattle, Miami, Denver, New York, and Palm Beach.

Filmography

Awards

References 

1989 births
Living people
21st-century Spanish actresses